Imran Ahmed Khan Sherwani (born 9 April 1962) is a former English international field hockey player.

International career
Sherwani won gold with the Great Britain squad at the 1988 Summer Olympics in Seoul. He played on the left wing, and scored two of the three goals against West Germany in the 1988 final, making a significant contribution to the match. In a BBC Sport article Imran Sherwani was quoted: "When we got back to Heathrow Airport it was bizarre for a hockey player to walk out to hundreds of cheering people. You see it with rugby and football but not usually hockey."

He also won silver with the England squad at the 1986 World Cup in London. Sherwani was capped 45 times for Great Britain and 49 times for England.

Club career
Sherwani started his career at North Stafford Hockey Club. He has also played club hockey for Stourport, Stone and Leek.

Coaching
As well as coaching at Leek, Sherwani has served as Director of Hockey at Denstone College in Staffordshire.

Personal life
Sherwani was born in Stoke-on-Trent, Staffordshire, and is of Pakistani descent. Ever since he played in his first match at the age of 14, Sherwani dreamt of playing in the Olympic Games. His father played hockey for Pakistan and his great uncles played football for Stoke City and Port Vale.

Sherwani worked as a policeman, but had to leave the Staffordshire Police force as his training programme became heavier, so to get by he became a newsagent like his father. He later worked as an independent financial adviser.

He also has links with Cannock Hockey Club, where his three sons played. Sherwani was selected as one of the torchbearers for the 2012 Summer Olympics torch relay.

In June 2021, Sherwani revealed that he had been diagnosed with early-onset Alzheimer's disease.

References

External links
 
 

1962 births
Living people
English people of Pakistani descent
English male field hockey players
Olympic field hockey players of Great Britain
British male field hockey players
English Olympic medallists
Olympic gold medallists for Great Britain
Field hockey players at the 1988 Summer Olympics
Sportspeople from Stoke-on-Trent
Olympic medalists in field hockey
Medalists at the 1988 Summer Olympics
British sportspeople of Pakistani descent